Jarod Cairns is a South African rugby union player for the  in the Currie Cup. His regular position is lock or flanker.

Cairns represented and captained the Western Province u/16 Grant Khomo side (2017), Western Province u/18 Academy side (2018), Western Province Sevens (2018), Western Province XV u/18 side(2019).   In 2019 Cairns represented and captained the South African Schools A side for the International Series. 

Cairns was named in the  side for the 2022 Currie Cup Premier Division.

References

South African rugby union players
Living people
Rugby union locks
Rugby union flankers
Golden Lions players
2001 births
Lions (United Rugby Championship) players